The 2013 Triglav Trophy was held on 27–31 March 2013. It was an international figure skating competition held annually in Jesenice, Slovenia. Skaters competed in the disciplines of men's and ladies' singles on the senior, junior, and novice levels.

Senior results

Men

Ladies

Junior results

Men

Ladies

Novice results

Boys

Girls

33 total competitors

References

External links
 2013 Triglav Trophy results

Triglav Trophy, 2013
Triglav Trophy